Friction, Baby is an album by Better Than Ezra, released in 1996.

The album's title comes from a television interview with Keith Richards of the Rolling Stones. When asked how he and Mick Jagger stayed together for so long, Richards took a long drag from his cigarette and said "friction, baby."  This may also be a reference to the fact that the band had replaced its original drummer, Cary Bonnecaze, between the recording of their previous album and this one.

The album produced two hits on the Billboard modern rock charts: "King of New Orleans" and "Desperately Wanting." "Desperately Wanting" also narrowly missed the Billboard Top 40, peaking at #48. The third and fourth singles, "Long Lost" and "Normal Town," failed to chart.

Critical reception
In its review, The A.V. Club called Friction, Baby "a batch of low-impact pop cheese that's too mindlessly catchy not to be likable."

Track listing
 "King of New Orleans" – 4:07
 "Rewind" – 3:07
 "Long Lost" – 3:40
 "Normal Town" – 3:39
 "Scared, Are You?" – 4:06
 "Return of the Post Moderns" – 2:54
 "Hung the Moon" – 3:46
 "Desperately Wanting" – 4:37
 "Still Life With Cooley" – 3:58
 "WWOZ" – 4:20
 "Happy Endings" – 2:43
 "Speeding Up to Slow Down" – 4:09
 "At Ch. Degaulle, Etc." – 6:37
 "Mejor de Ezra" (3:17) starts at 3:20 into the track.

On early copies of the album, the hidden track "Mejor de Ezra" is contained in the pregap. Later copies of the album tack this secret track onto the end of the album.

All songs were composed by Kevin Griffin.

Personnel
 Kevin Griffin – Guitar, Vocals
 Tom Drummond – Bass
 Travis McNabb – Drums

Additional personnel
 Joan Wasser – Violin
 Peter Holsapple – Piano, Organ, Mandolin
 Anthony Dagrade – Saxophone, Clarinet, Flute
 Jamil Sharie – Trumpet
 Mark Mullins – Trombone
 Matthew Perrine – Tuba
 Lawrence Sieberth – Piano
 James Arthur Payne – Guitar

References 

Better Than Ezra albums
1996 albums
Elektra Records albums
Albums produced by Don Gehman